Bennington, Vermont is a town in Southeastern Vermont. It is the sixth-largest municipality in the state.

Bennington, Vermont may also refer to several places:
 Old Bennington, Vermont, a historic village located within the town of Bennington
 Bennington County, Vermont, a county in Southeastern Vermont
 North Bennington, Vermont, a village located within the town of Bennington
 Bennington (CDP), Vermont, the census-designated place that makes up downtown Bennington